The Glio-Oubi language (Glio-Ubi) is a Kru language of the Niger–Congo language family. It has a lexical similarity of 0.75 with the Glaro-Twabo language.

In 1991, Glio was spoken by 3,500 people in Liberia and 2,500 Oubi speakers in Ivory Coast.

See also 
 Languages of Africa
 Languages of Ivory Coast

References 

Languages of Ivory Coast
Languages of Liberia
Grebo languages